Diana Alice Bellamy (September 19, 1943 – June 17, 2001) was an American character actress of stage, film, and television, during the 1980s and mid-2000s, who was often cast in both comedic and dramatic roles to great acclaim. Bellamy is known for her starring role as Head Nurse Maggie Poole in the NBC comedy 13 East, as Principal Cecilia Hall in Popular, and as Mrs. Pananides in Outbreak and Air Force One.

Life and career
Bellamy was born on September 19, 1943, in Los Angeles, California. Her family had ties to the establishment of Early Virginia and her father, Victor "Vic" Bellamy, was a Juilliard graduate and opera singer who later became a local Western actor. Diana did her undergraduate work at The University of South Florida in Tampa.She was active in the Theater Department. She attended Southern Methodist University (SMU) from which she graduated with a fine arts master's degree in 1970. She began her career with her own puppet theatre in her native Los Angeles and later began working professionally on the stage. Some of her stage work consists of appearances in The House of Blue Leaves at the Pasadena Playhouse, The Skin of Our Teeth at the Old Globe Theatre in San Diego and the title role in Sister Mary Ignatius Explains It All for You at Theater Geo in Los Angeles, and the handicapped Mrs. Nichols in Dorothy Parker’s The Ladies of the Corridor at the Tamarind Theater. In 1986, the Los Angeles Times wrote that she became her character of a snake handler in Talking With... (1986). "This is not an actress," they wrote, "this is a swamp woman holding a box with holes in it." She was praised in her role of Sister Mary in Sister Mary Ignatius Explains It All For You at Theatre Geo in 1994. The Los Angeles Times wrote, "When Bellamy is good, she is very, very good."

In 1986 she was the strong and shapely policewoman who helped the young protagonists to defeat the criminal gang in Tom Trbovich's Free Ride.

Although she suffered from cancer, blindness, and diabetes she never let her illnesses stop her from pursuing a career in acting and she later went on to appear in over 80 film and TV roles throughout the 1980s up until her death, some of which included Murder, She Wrote; Tall Tales and Legends; Matlock; Alien Nation; Married...with Children; Life Goes On; Family Ties; Murphy Brown; Baywatch; Grace Under Fire; Wings; Seinfeld; Living Single; The Secret World of Alex Mack; and Life with Roger. Her film appearances included Malice, Air Force One, Outbreak, Ghosts of Mississippi, and Outrageous Fortune. Her first regular television role was as Nurse Poole in 13 East, which started in 1989. Her final role was a guest spot on Diagnosis Murder in the episode Being of Sound Mind which aired on March 2, 2001. Bellamy was a registered Democrat and a lifelong parishioner of the Methodist church.

She died from cancer at her home in Valley Village, California, three months later on June 17, 2001, at the age of 57. A memorial service was held for Bellamy on July 7, 2001, at the Court Theater in West Hollywood, California, and her cremains were scattered in the Pacific Ocean. Bellamy, in her own words, said of her health in a 1999 interview, "I had tried crying and being in a snit about blindness, but that was real boring. I've learned to live with it as best I can, and I feel very blessed that this has happened."

Filmography

Cinema 
 1983 D.C. Cab as Maudie
 1985 Police Academy 2: Their First Assignment as Nurse
 1986 Free Ride as Woman Guard
 1986 My Chauffeur as Blue Lady
 1986 Crossroads as Hospital Supervisor
 1986 Odd Jobs as Woman In Restaurant
 1987 Outrageous Fortune as Madam
 1987 Stripped to Kill as Shirl
 1987 Blind Date as Maid
 1987 Maid to Order as Woman In Unemployment Office
 1987 Born in East L.A. as Harry's Wife
 1987 Under Cover (1987) as Lynette Destens
 1988 The Nest as Mrs. Pennington
 1988 Spellbinder as Grace Woods
 1991 Critters 3 as Rosalie
 1992 Passed Away as "Froggie"
 1992 Passed Away as B.J.
 1993 Malice as Ms. Worthington
 1995 Outbreak as Mrs. Pananides
 1996 Diabolique as Ms. Vawze
 1996 Ghosts of Mississippi as Barbara Holder
 1997 Air Force One as Switchboard Operator

Television 
 1983 The Skin of Our Teeth  as Miss E. Muse / Ivy
 1985 Condor (TV Movie) as Opera Singer
 1986 Hunter as Waterworks Receptionist
 1988 Shootdown (TV Movie) as Lillian
 1989 The Final Days as Rose Mary Woods
 1989-1990 13 East as Maggie Poole
 1992 On the Air as Ethel Thissle
 1994 Living Single as Judge Glazer
 1994 Amelia Earhart: The Final Flight (TV Movie) as Mrs. Atkinson
 1994-1995 Superhuman Samurai Syber-Squad as Cha-Cha Rimba Starkey
 1996 Married... with Children as Shirley
 1996 Wings as Mother (voice)
 1997 Desert's Edge (TV Movie)
 1999-2001 Popular as Principal Cecelia Hall

Theater 
 1981 Funny Girl at Sebastian's/West as Mama Brice
 1984 Creatures at Odyssey Theatre as Sister Ratissa
 1985 The Serving of Two Masters at Playbill Theatre as Adaptation
 1985 Romeo and Juliet at The Globe Playhouse as The Nurse
 1986 Why Hanna's Skirt Won't Stay Down at Coast Playhouse as Sophie
 1986 Talking With... at the Olio Theater as Snake Handler
 1987 Mensch Meier at the Odyssey Theatre as Mama
 1987 The House of Blue Leaves at the Pasadena Playhouse as Sister Superior
 1992 Lady-Like at the Philadelphia Theatre Company as Mary Carryll
 1994 Sister Mary Ignatius Explains It All For You at Theatre Geo as Sister Mary
 1996 Weekend in Goshen at Theatre Geo as Art's Mother

References

External links

1943 births
2001 deaths
Deaths from cancer in California
Actresses from Los Angeles
People from Greater Los Angeles
20th-century American actresses
21st-century American actresses
American blind people
American stage actresses
American television actresses
American film actresses
Southern Methodist University alumni
Methodists from California
California Democrats
American puppeteers
20th-century American memoirists
American women memoirists